The Municipality of Northern Bruce Peninsula is located on the Bruce Peninsula in Bruce County, Ontario, Canada. It is a popular vacation spot in the summer for its water sports and cottaging, and in the winter for snowmobiling. The municipality was formed on January 1, 1999, when the townships of St. Edmunds, Lindsay, and Eastnor (which was named after Eastnor, Herefordshire), as well as the Village of Lion's Head, were amalgamated.

It is home to the Bruce Peninsula National Park, the Fathom Five National Marine Park, and the Lion's Head Provincial Park.

Communities
Its main population centres are Lion's Head and Tobermory. Other communities include Barrow Bay, Clarke's Corners, Dyer's Bay, Ferndale, Hope Bay, Miller Lake, Pike Bay, and Stokes Bay.

Demographics 

Population trend:
 Population in 2011: 3744
 Population in 2006: 3850
 Population in 2001: 3599
 Population total in 1996: 3500
 Eastnor (township): 1443
 Lindsay (township): 500
 Lion's Head (village): 550
 St. Edmunds (township): 1007

See also
List of townships in Ontario

References

External links

Lower-tier municipalities in Ontario
Municipalities in Bruce County